Cristina Asquith Baker (1868–1960) was an Australian artist known for her paintings and lithographs. She studied with Frederick McCubbin, one of the key artists of the Australian impressionist Heidelberg school, but she was independent and did not tie herself to a single school of thought. She twice studied abroad, in Paris and London, gaining expertise in various other forms of artistic expression such as lithography and carpet-making.

Early life
Asquith Baker was born in London, England, in 1868. Her parents were William Asquith Baker and Cristina Millbanks. Her niece, Jean Morrison recalls that the members of the extended family were always close-knit, supporting one another and sharing accommodation at times. The family migrated to Melbourne in 1870. After having been relocated around the state of Victoria many times in her childhood, due to her father's occupation as a clergyman, the final school that she attended was the Presbyterian Ladies' College, Melbourne, also attended by her life-long friend and fellow artist Ada May Plante.

After leaving school, Asquith Baker embarked upon her professional training as an artist, which she continued intermittently over the years, not only in Australia but also in Paris and London, as follows:
 mid-1880s – Port Melbourne School of Art
 1888 – National Gallery of Victoria Art School (so named 1867–1973, then the Victorian College of the Arts). Frederick McCubbin was her drawing teacher.
 c. 1890: Melbourne School of Art.  Awarded free tuition for a year
 1895 – returned to the National Gallery of Victoria Art School
 1903 – studied at the Académie Julian in Paris
 1904 – 2 works accepted into Paris Old Salon
 1914 – studied lithography in London

Career
In 1896 Asquith Baker had completed her initial training and began her professional life, in Melbourne. She first showed her work in public at an exhibition that year, with the Victorian Artists Society.

In 1902 she left Australia to study and work in Paris and London. Despite selling her paintings for good prices she gained only a subsistence living, and returned to Melbourne in 1905. Here she was able to supplement her painting earnings by running classes in painting and drawing at her studio at Alexander Chambers in Elizabeth Street, Melbourne.

In 1909, Asquith Baker was elected to the Council of the Victorian Artists Society.

1912–1914 she went again to Paris & London.

Whilst in London she turned down an invitation to paint roses exclusively, for a gallery. Asquith Baker is said to have had particularly fond childhood memories of the country town of Seymour, where her family lived for four years in the 1870s. This may be part of the reason why, in 1914, she declared that landscape was a part of her artistic life and she would not give it up in order to paint only roses.

1914 marked the beginning of World War I, and Asquith Baker returned to Melbourne, where she remained for the rest of her life, apart from time spent in South Australia to provide her sister with companionship (1939–1945), and an excursion to Alice Springs to paint (aged 87).

In 1932 she entered two portraits in the competition for the Archibald prize, and was judged to be one of the finalists.

Exhibitions 
Exhibitions showing her work include:
1896 with the Victorian Artists Society 
1898  Royal Academy, London. Her painting "Quiet of the Cottage" shown.  1904  the same painting was shown in Paris Old Salon
1906–1912 regularly exhibited with the Victorian Artists Society and the Melbourne Society of Women Painters and Sculptors.
1911 with the Yarra Sculptors and the Melbourne Athenaeum.
1913 Baillie Gallery, Bond St, London. Solo exhibition of Australian landscapes, portraits and flora.
1914 Miss Nicholl's Studio, England.  Solo exhibition 
1977 Jim Alexander Gallery, East Malvern, Victoria.  Title of exhibition: The printmakers mainly of the thirties: important women artists.  Exhibition included C Asquith Baker and several of her contemporaries: Violet Teague, Mary Meyer and A.M.E. Bale (already on show in gallery).
1978  Duvance Galleries: "A Collection of Australian Women Artists, 1900–1970".
1986  Jim Alexander Gallery, 13 Emo Rd, East Malvern, Victoria. Solo exhibition.
2018  S H Ervin Gallery, Sydney. Title of exhibition: "Intrepid Women: Australian Women Artists in Paris, 1900–1950".

Death and legacy 
In 1960 Asquith Baker died at the age of 92, in Surrey Hills.  She continued to paint until the end of her life.

Her work is held in the collections of the following galleries:

Australian National Gallery
Art Gallery of South Australia
Cruthers Collection of Women's Art at the University of Western Australia
National Gallery of Victoria

References

External links 
Note: Researchers may find it helpful to know that in the art history literature her name is often mis-spelt as Christina, and her double surname is often reduced to Baker.

 Artnet web site of auction entries. Eight paintings and one work on paper.
 Moore, W 1980, The story of Australian Art: from the earliest known art of the continent to the art of today, Angus and Robertson, Sydney, p. 132.
  Online biography of Asquith Baker by her niece, Jean Morrison

1868 births
1960 deaths
Australian women painters
19th-century Australian artists
20th-century Australian artists
19th-century Australian women artists
20th-century Australian women artists
Australian printmakers
Women printmakers
People educated at the Presbyterian Ladies' College, Melbourne
Artists from Melbourne
English emigrants to colonial Australia